Micraglossa manoi is a moth in the family Crambidae. It was described by Sasaki in 1998. It is found in Taiwan, China (Guizhou) and Nepal. It is found at altitudes above 1,600 meters.

The length of the forewings is 6.5–8 mm for males and 6.5–8 mm for females. The ground colour of the forewings is white, suffused with dark brown to black scales. The basal area at the base and at the costa is blackish brown. The antemedian, postmedian and subterminal lines are whitish.

References

Moths described in 1998
Scopariinae